The 14th National Television Awards ceremony was held at the Royal Albert Hall on 29 October 2008. It was the last to be hosted by Sir Trevor McDonald and last to be held at the Albert Hall. David Tennant announced via a live video link from Stratford-upon-Avon that he would be leaving Doctor Who after playing the role of The Doctor for 3 series. He said after winning the Outstanding Drama Performance award:

Awards

References

National Television Awards
National Television Awards
National Television Awards
2008 in London
National Television Awards
National Television Awards